Coupa Software is a global technology platform for Business Spend Management (BSM). The company is headquartered in San Mateo, California with offices throughout Europe, Latin America, and Asia Pacific. Coupa helps companies gain visibility into and control over how they spend money, optimize supply chains, and manage liquidity.  

In 2016, Coupa Software went public on the Nasdaq, trading as COUP. It was taken private by Thoma Bravo in February 2023.

History
Dave Stephens and Noah Eisner founded Coupa in 2006. Rob Bernshteyn took over as Coupa's CEO in February 2009. In September 2009, Coupa secured a $7.5 million Series C funding round.

In 2014, The Forrester Wave named Coupa a market leader. In May, Ariba, a unit of SAP and a competitor of Coupa, filed a lawsuit alleging that Coupa misappropriated Ariba trade secrets. Also in 2014, the company expanded globally, announcing new operations in Dublin, Ireland.

In February 2015, Coupa acquired the assets of ZenPurchase, an enterprise procurement software company, as well as acquiring InvoiceSmash, an e-invoicing vendor, and TripScanner, an open booking vendor, in July. Coupa was also positioned in the Leaders quadrant of the Gartner Magic Quadrant for Procure-to-Pay Suites for Indirect Procurement. On September 24, 2015, Ariba and Coupa settled their lawsuit. Coupa acknowledged its possession of Ariba information and is required to abide by certain procedures to prevent any misappropriation in the future. Coupa paid Ariba an undisclosed amount.

In January 2016, Coupa acquired Contractually, a cloud-based contract management solution.

In 2020, Coupa acquired AI supply chain design company LLamasoft.

In 2021, Coupa debuted its new venture capital fund, Coupa Ventures. On June 15, Coupa launched its Sustainable Business Spend Management (BSM) platform, to help business owners with their sustainability initiatives.

In March 2022, Coupa was named a Leader in the Forrester Wave Supplier Value Management Platform. In May, Coupa added analysis features to its procurement management software to track Scope 1, 2 and 3 emissions reductions and how these contribute to supplier sustainability goals. 

In December 2022, Thoma Bravo outbid Vista Equity Partners to announce its acquisition of Coupa for $6.15 billion in cash, and a total enterprise value of $8 billion.

Technology
Coupa's cloud-based Business Spend Management solution manages transactions across procurement, payment, and supply chain. Coupa's BSM platform collects anonymized customer data to make recommendations to improve business transactions.

In 2006, its first free open-source product, Coupa Express, was built using RoR. In 2007, the company launched a SaaS (Software-as-a-service) product called Coupa On Demand for SMBs (small and midsize businesses).

In November 2011, Coupa released its first spend analysis product called Coupa Spend Optimizer.

In April 2014, Coupa introduced Coupa Inventory, a portal for viewing inventory availability when ordering, to reduce wasteful spending.

With Coupa's acquisition of LLamasoft in 2020, the company added AI-powered supply chain design to its platform. 

On June 15, 2021, Coupa launched its Sustainable Business Spend Management (BSM) platform, to help business owners with their sustainability initiatives. Coupa added configurations to its BSM platform, embedding ESG to optimize supply chains and reduce  emissions.

In February 2022, Coupa launched Community.ai, which benchmarks data to embed performance feedback, operational support, and prescriptive recommendations. The company also launched its Coupa Travel & Expense platform, which includes features from its acquisitions and offers a service for booking flights, hotels, cars and dining. Coupa received its FedRAMP Moderate certification in March 2022.

References

External links

2006 establishments in California
American companies established in 2006
Software companies established in 2006
Software companies based in the San Francisco Bay Area
Companies based in San Mateo, California
Companies formerly listed on the Nasdaq
2016 initial public offerings
Software companies of the United States
Customer relationship management software companies
2023 mergers and acquisitions
Private equity portfolio companies